Donnea Castle is a castle in the village Guigoven, municipality of Kortessem, eastern Belgium. The main building was built in 1801–1802.

See also
List of castles in Belgium

External links
Kasteel De Donnea, kastelen in Limburg nl

References

Castles in Belgium
Castles in Limburg (Belgium)